Hellinsia carphodactoides is a species of moth in the genus Hellinsia, known from Papua New Guinea. Moths in this species take flight in November, and have a wingspan of approximately 15 millimetres. The specific name "carphodactoides" refers to the species' similarity to its sister taxon Hellinsia carphodactyla.

References

carphodactoides
Moths of New Guinea
Insects of Papua New Guinea
Moths described in 2003